is a Japanese voice actress, who was born on July 8, 1967, in Tokyo, Japan. She is represented by 81 Produce.

Notable filmography
Nataku in Saiyuki
Kanoe in X/1999 the series
Kinu in Shinobido: Way of the Ninja
Cher Degré in Wolf's Rain
Miho Karasuma in Witch Hunter Robin
Ultima in the Radio Edition of Final Fantasy Tactics Advance
Nephelia in Galaxy Angel: Moonlit Lovers
Announcer in Sonic Adventure
Computer Voice and various Female Citizens of Haven City in Jak II (Japanese version)
Madam Oreille in Darker than Black: Ryūsei no Gemini
Solice Malvin in Pumpkin Scissors
Twi Chang in D.Gray-man Hallow
Arisa Munakata in Tomica Hyper Rescue Drive Head Kidō Kyūkyū Keisatsu
Keiei Lee in Godzilla Singular Point

Dubbing
Bottoms Up, Lisa Mancini (Paris Hilton)
Bring It On Again, Tina Hammersmith (Bree Turner)
Chicken with Plums, Faranguisse (Maria de Medeiros)
Cursed, Ellie Myers (Christina Ricci)
Daddy Day Camp, Kim Hinton (Tamala Jones)
Duets, Suzi Loomis (Maria Bello)
Enough Said, Eva (Julia Louis-Dreyfus)
The Fabulous Baker Boys, Nina
The Fast and the Furious, Mia Toretto (Jordana Brewster)
Final Destination 3, Erin Ulmer (Alexz Johnson)
Fired Up!, Diora (Molly Sims)
Julie & Julia, Julie Powell (Amy Adams)
My Life Without Me, Ann (Leonor Watling)
Sabrina the Teenage Witch, Jenny Kelley (Michelle Beaudoin)
Saw III, Amanda Young (Shawnee Smith)

References

External links
 

1967 births
Living people
81 Produce voice actors
Japanese voice actresses
Voice actresses from Tokyo Metropolis